Wabamun 133A is a First Nations reserve in central Alberta, Canada in Division No. 11. It is located adjacent to Parkland County on the east shore of Lake Wabamun and is home to the Paul First Nation. The Summer Village of Kapasiwin, the Wabamun 133B Indian reserve, and the Hamlet of Duffield are adjacent to Wabamun 133A to the northwest, north, and east respectively.

Demographics 
In 2006, Wabamun 133A had a population of 1,088 living in 207 dwellings, a 9.0% increase from 2001.

See also 
List of communities in Alberta
List of Indian reserves in Alberta

References 

Edmonton Metropolitan Region
Indian reserves in Alberta